Kevin Pierre Lafrance (born 13 January 1990) is a professional footballer who most recently played as a centre-back for Polish side Stomil Olsztyn.

Born in France, he represents the Haiti national team at international level.

Club career
Born in Bondy, France, Lafrance played club football in the Czech Republic and Poland for Baník Most, Slavia Prague, Viktoria Žižkov and Widzew Łódź.

In June 2019 he signed for APOEL. After a loan spell with Pafos, in January 2021 he moved to AEK Larnaca.

After playing with Doxa Katokopias, he signed for Stomil Olsztyn in February 2022.

International career
He made his international debut for Haiti in 2010.

International goals
Scores and results list Haiti's goal tally first.

References

1990 births
Living people
Sportspeople from Bondy
Association football defenders
French footballers
French sportspeople of Haitian descent
Citizens of Haiti through descent
Haitian footballers
Haitian expatriate footballers
Haiti international footballers
FK Baník Most players
SK Slavia Prague players
FK Viktoria Žižkov players
Widzew Łódź players
Czech First League players
Ekstraklasa players
I liga players
Miedź Legnica players
Chrobry Głogów players
AEL Limassol players
APOEL FC players
Pafos FC players
AEK Larnaca FC players
Doxa Katokopias FC players
OKS Stomil Olsztyn players
2013 CONCACAF Gold Cup players
2015 CONCACAF Gold Cup players
Copa América Centenario players
2021 CONCACAF Gold Cup players
Cypriot First Division players
French expatriate footballers
Expatriate footballers in the Czech Republic
Expatriate footballers in Poland
Expatriate footballers in Cyprus
French expatriate sportspeople in the Czech Republic
French expatriate sportspeople in Poland
French expatriate sportspeople in Cyprus
Haitian expatriate sportspeople in the Czech Republic
Haitian expatriate sportspeople in Poland
Haitian expatriate sportspeople in Cyprus
Footballers from Seine-Saint-Denis